Robat-e Sheverin (also Romanized as Robāţ-e Sheverīn, Robāţ-e Shūrīn, and Robāţ-e Shavarīn; also known as Robāţ) is a village in Hegmataneh Rural District, in the Central District of Hamadan County, Hamadan Province, Iran. At the 2006 census, its population was 968, in 201 families.

See also
Robat (disambiguation)

References

Populated places in Hamadan County